"What Am I Gonna Do with You" is a popular song recorded by Barry White. Written and produced by White, the song was his fifth top ten hit on the Billboard Hot 100 singles chart in the US, reaching number eight and spending a week at number one on the Billboard Hot Soul Singles chart during spring 1975. In the UK, it peaked at number five on the UK Singles Chart. It appeared on White's 1975 album, Just Another Way to Say I Love You.

Chart positions

Weekly charts

References

[ Song Review] from Allmusic

1975 singles
Barry White songs
Disco songs
Songs written by Barry White
20th Century Fox Records singles
1975 songs